Löbau (Sachs) is a railway station  in the town of Löbau, Saxony, Germany. The station lies on the Görlitz–Dresden railway and Ebersbach–Löbau railway, also on the former Großpostwitz–Löbau railway and Löbau–Radibor railway.

Train services
The station is served by regional and local services, which are operated by Trilex.

Bus services
22 Löbau – Zittau
27 Löbau – Zittau
42 Löbau – Bernstadt – Görlitz
50 Löbau – Oppach – Ebersbach – Neugersdorf
52 Löbau – Schönbach – Neusalza-Spremberg
53 Löbau-Dürrhennersdorf – Friedersdorf-Ebersbach
55 Löbau – Kottmarsdorf – Neugersdorf
56 Löbau – Obercunnersdorf – Neugersdorf
60 Löbau – Ottenhain – Herwigsdorf
62 Löbau – Lautitz – Weißenberg/Mauschwitz
64 Löbau – Kittlitz – Krappe – Weißenberg
67 Löbau Town Service
68 Löbau – Bischdorf – Rosenhain – Löbau
69 Löbau – Georgewitz – Bellwitz – Kittlitz

References

External links
 
 Deutsche Bahn's station website
 Vogtlandbahn website
 Ostdeutsche Eisenbahn website
 Abellio KVG Buses website
 Abellio KVG Network Map

Railway stations in Saxony
railway station
Buildings and structures in Görlitz (district)
Railway stations in Germany opened in 1846